Mats Lindqvist (born 9 July 1963) is a Swedish weightlifter. He competed at the 1988 Summer Olympics and the 1992 Summer Olympics.

References

External links
 

1963 births
Living people
Swedish male weightlifters
Olympic weightlifters of Sweden
Weightlifters at the 1988 Summer Olympics
Weightlifters at the 1992 Summer Olympics
Sportspeople from Helsingborg
20th-century Swedish people